Titus Ekiru (born 2 January 1992) is a Kenyan long-distance runner. He represented Kenya at the 2019 African Games and he won the men's half marathon with a time of 1:01:42. He became the first Kenyan to win this event at the African Games. This was also a new African Games record.

Career 

In 2017, he won the Seville Marathon in Seville, Spain with a time of 2:07:42.

In 2018, he won the Honolulu Marathon with a time of 2:09:01 and the half marathon event of the Rock 'n' Roll San Diego Marathon with a time of 1:01:02. He also won the Mexico City Marathon event with a new course record of 2:10:38.

In 2019, he won the Milano City Marathon and he set a new course record of 2:04:46. In that year, he also won the Portugal Half Marathon and he set a new course record of 1:00:12. In December 2019, he won the Honolulu Marathon for the 2nd time with a new course record of 2:07:59.

In 2021, he won the Milano City Marathon and he set a new course record of 2:02:57. He also won the Abu Dhabi Marathon held in Abu Dhabi, United Arab Emirates.

Achievements

References

External links 
 

Living people
1992 births
Place of birth missing (living people)
Kenyan male marathon runners
Kenyan male long-distance runners
African Games gold medalists for Kenya
African Games medalists in athletics (track and field)
Athletes (track and field) at the 2019 African Games
African Games gold medalists in athletics (track and field)
20th-century Kenyan people
21st-century Kenyan people